The 2022–23 season is Real Madrid's 92nd in existence, their 67th consecutive season in the top flight of Spanish basketball and 16th consecutive season in the EuroLeague. It is also the first season since 2010–11 without Pablo Laso, one of the most successful coaches in the club's history.

Times up to 30 October 2022 and from 26 March 2023 are CEST (UTC+2). Times from 30 October 2022 to 26 March 2023 are CET (UTC+1).

Overview

Pre-season
After winning their 36th Spanish title in the previous season, Real Madrid faced a summer of changes. The club part ways with three players – Trey Thompkins, Jeffery Taylor and Thomas Heurtel – in the span of 4 days, between 25 and 29 June 2022. The most meaningful change was the replacement of the legendary head coach Pablo Laso, who had suffered a heart attack, with Jesús Mateo, as the club deemed Laso's continuity to be too risky for his health given his condition.

On 6 and 7 July 2022, Real Madrid announced that Fabien Causeur and captain Sergio Llull had extended their contracts through 2024. Five days later, the club announced that Rudy Fernández had renewed through 2023.

On 14 July 2022, Real Madrid announced Džanan Musa, last season's ACB MVP, as the club's first signing in the post-Laso era. Four days later, Sergio Rodríguez returned to Madrid on a 1-year deal. On 21 July, Mario Hezonja became Real Madrid's third addition. On 27 July, Petr Cornelie signed for one year with Madrid.

Players

Squad information

Depth chart

Transactions

In

|}

Out

|}

Pre-season and friendlies

Friendly matches

Competitions

Overview

Liga ACB

League table

Results summary

Results by round

Matches

EuroLeague

League table

Results summary

Results by round

Matches

Copa del Rey

Supercopa de España

Statistics

Liga ACB

Source:

EuroLeague

Source:

References

External links
 

 
Real Madrid
Real Madrid